The Rise and Fall of Mars Hill is a podcast that discusses the popularity, and later scandal associated with Mars Hill Church and Mark Driscoll. The show is hosted by Mike Cosper and produced by Christianity Today.

Background 
The podcast discusses Mark Driscoll's resignation from Mars Hill Church in Seattle. Mars Hill Church was founded in 1996 and later collapsed in 2014. Mars Hill Church had twelve thousand weekly attendance, roughly six thousand members, and twelve different locations. The first episode emphasizes that pastors like Driscoll have a lot of charisma and natural speaking ability, but they lack the character needed to properly use those abilities. The show focuses on the culture surrounding megachurches and evangelicalism, however, the show is produced by the evangelical magazine Christianity Today and it is hosted by a former pastor, Mike Cosper. The show discusses Mars Hill's emphasis on church growth. The show draws out the connections between Mars Hill Church and the Southern Baptist Convention.

The show discusses how the Acts 29 network was co-founded by Driscoll. The podcast focuses heavily on masculinity and opines that Driscoll's approach to motivating men is a form of toxic masculinity. The show discusses Driscoll's Calvinist approach to theology and his emphasis on the need for men to stand and fight against things like feminism, LGBTQ culture, Islam, and secularism. Driscoll is grouped with other celebrity pastors who have lost public support such as Ravi Zacharias and Bill Hybels.

Format 
The show is a twelve part series. The show interviews guests from a variety of disciplines—historians, sociologists, and anthropologists—in order to better understand Mars Hill and Mark Driscoll. Episode five included an interview with Dr. Rose Madrid-Swetman. There are several bonus episodes, one dedicated specifically to Joshua Harris, as well as interviews with counselor Aundi Kolber, Christian therapist Dan Allender, and pastor Timothy Keller. The podcast's title and journalistic style resemble the true crime genre.

Reception 
The podcast received four out of five mics from Podcast Magazine. Concerns have been raised by Brad Hambrick of the Center for Faith & Culture regarding whether a podcast like The Rise and Fall of Mars Hill Church is healthy or not. Trevin Wax of The Gospel Coalition, noted that "Christian podcasts in the journalism genre will stand in the shadow of this one, much like Serial changed the game for narrative podcasts nationwide" and the show's production quality has been noted by others.

See also 

 Oh No, Ross and Carrie!
 Harry Potter and the Sacred Text
 On Being

References

External links 
 

American podcasts
2021 podcast debuts
Religion and spirituality podcasts
Audio podcasts
Christian podcasts
Documentary podcasts